Zambia has several major indigenous languages, all members of the Bantu family, as well as Khwedam, Zambian Sign Language, several immigrant languages and the pidgins Settla and Fanagalo. English is the official language and the major language of business and education.

Indigenous Zambian languages 

Zambia has 72 languages, some of which have a long history in Zambia, while others, such as Silozi, arose as a result of 18th- and 19th-century migrations. All of Zambia's major languages by native-speaker population are members of the Bantu family and are closely related to one another.

Seven native languages are officially recognized as regional languages. Together, these represent the major languages of each province: Bemba (Northern Province, Luapula, Muchinga and the Copperbelt), Nyanja (Lusaka and the Eastern Province), Lozi (Western Province), Tonga and Lozi (Southern Province), and Kaonde, Luvale and Lunda (Northwestern Province). These seven languages are used, together with English, in early primary schooling and in some government publications.  A common orthography was approved by the Ministry of Education in 1977.

According to the 2000 census, Zambia's most widely spoken languages are Bemba (spoken by 35% of the population as either a first or second language), Nyanja (37%), Tonga (25%) and Lozi (18%).

In some languages, particularly Bemba and Nyanja, Zambians distinguish between a "deep" form of the language, associated with older and more traditional speakers in rural areas, and urban forms (sometimes called "town language" or Chitauni, such as Town Bemba and Town Nyanja) that incorporate a large number of borrowings from English and other innovations.

An urban variety of Nyanja is the lingua franca of the capital Lusaka and is widely spoken as a second language throughout Zambia. Bemba, the country's largest indigenous language, also serves as a lingua franca in some areas.

Significance of Zambian languages 
Local Zambian languages play an important role in different sectors of society. For instance, in the education sector, local languages allow pupils to express themselves freely.

Zambian English 

English, the former colonial language, serves as a common language among educated Zambians. At independence in 1964, English was declared the national language. English is the first language of only 2% of Zambians but is the most commonly used second language.

The English spoken in Zambia has some distinctive features, such as the omission of certain object pronouns that would be obligatory in Western English ("Did you reach?"), the simplification of some phrasal verbs ("throw" instead of "throw away"), subtle differences in the usage of auxiliary verbs such as "should", simplification of vowel sounds (some Zambians may regard "taste" and "test" as homophones), and the incorporation of particles derived from Zambia's indigenous languages (such as chi "big/bad" and ka "little"). Zambian English also incorporates South African words such as braai for "barbecue".

Percentage distribution of major language groups 

Source: 2010 Census

List of languages 
The established languages of Zambia are:

 Afrikaans
 Aushi
 Bemba
 Bwile
 Chichewa
 Chokwe
 Congo Swahili
 English
 Fwe
 Gujarati
 Ila
 Kaonde
 Khwedam
 Kuhane
 Kunda
 Lala-Bisa
 Lamba
 Lambya
 Lenje
 Lozi
 Luchazi
 Lunda
 Luvale
 Luyana
 Mambwe-Lungu
 Mashi
 Mbowe
 Mbukushu
 Mbunda
 Nkoya
 Nsenga
 Nyamwanga
 Nyiha
 Nyika
 Pidgin Zulu
 Sala
 Settla
 Shona
 Simaa
 Soli
 Taabwa
 Tonga
 Totela
 Tumbuka
 Yao
 Yauma
 Zambian Sign Language

References

Bibliography
 Chimuka, S. S. (1977). Zambian languages: orthography approved by the Ministry of Education. Lusaka : National Educational Company of Zambia (NECZAM).
 Kashoki, Mubanga E. and Ohannessian, Sirarpa. (1978) Language in Zambia. London: International African Institute.
 Kashoki, Mubanga E. (1981). Harmonization of African languages: standardization of orthography in Zambia in In African Languages: Proceedings of the Meeting of Experts on the Transcription and Harmonization of African Languages, Niamey (Niger), 17–21 July 1978, (pp. 164–75). Paris: UNESCO.
 Kashoki, Mubanga E. (1990) The Factor of Language in Zambia. Lusaka: Kenneth Kaunda Foundation.
 Marten, Lutz; Kula, Nancy C. (2008) "One Zambia, One Nation, Many Languages" in Simpson, A. ed., 2008, Language and National Identity in Africa, Oxford: OUP, 291–313.
Chanda, Vincent M. and Mkandawire, Sitwe Benson. (2013). 'Speak Zambian Languages'. Lusaka: UNZAPRESS
Mkandawire, S. B. (2017). "Familiar Language Based Instruction versus Unfamiliar Language for the Teaching of Reading and Writing Skills: A Focus on Zambian Languages and English at two Primary Schools in Lusaka". Zambian Journal of Language Studies, 1(1), 53–82. 
Mkandawire, Sitwe Benson (2017b). "Terminological Dilemma on Familiar language based instruction and English language: A reflection on Language of Initial Literacy Instruction in Zambia" Journal of Lexicography and Terminology, 1(1), 45–58. 
Tambulukani, Geoffrey Kazembe (2015). "First Language Teaching of Initial Reading: Blessing or Curse for the Zambian Children under Primary Reading Programme?" Ph.D. thesis, University of Zambia.
 Tordoff, William (ed.) (1974) Politics in Zambia. Manchester: Manchester University Press.
 Republic of Zambia. Constitution of Zambia 1991 (as amended by Act no. 18 of 1996).

External links
 Census data from Zambia from Central Statistical Office, Zambia
 Ethnologue Listing of Zambian Languages
 Bibliography of books on languages spoken in Zambia
Regional Languages of Zambia 
Ethnic and linguistic composition
Languages
One Zambia, One Nation, Many Languages